The 1989–90 Honduran Segunda División was the 23rd season of the Honduran Segunda División.  Under the management of Roberto Scalessi, Tela Timsa won the tournament after finishing first in the final round (or Hexagonal) and obtained promotion to the 1990–91 Honduran Liga Nacional.

Final round
Also known as Hexagonal.

Standings

Known results

References

Segunda
1989